Avenue is a former Dutch glossy monthly magazine. In its original form it was established in 1965 and shut down in 1994. In 2001 publisher VNU restarted the magazine, but it survived only four issues.

History 
In its first era the magazine was influential. Joop Swart served as the editor-in-chief of the magazine, which attracted writers as culinary journalist Wina Born, photographer Ed van der Elsken and the authors Jan Cremer, W.F. Hermans and Cees Nooteboom. At its height the magazine sold 125,000 copies a month.

Its core public were women between 25 and 55 years of age. Its secondary public were men of that age range.

References

1965 establishments in the Netherlands
1994 disestablishments in the Netherlands
Defunct magazines published in the Netherlands
Women's magazines published in the Netherlands
Dutch-language magazines
Magazines established in 1965
Magazines disestablished in 1994